Erik af Klint may refer to:

 Erik af Klint (1732–1812), Swedish navy officer
 Eric af Klint (1813–1877), Swedish army officer
 Erik af Klint (1816–1866), Swedish navy officer
 Erik af Klint (1901–1981), Swedish navy officer